Arber Xhekaj (pronounced , , born January 30, 2001) is a Canadian professional ice hockey player for  the Montreal Canadiens of the National Hockey League (NHL).

Playing career

Amateur
While playing minor hockey with the Hamilton Huskies of Alliance Hockey, Xhekaj was known for having a comparatively slight frame, and as a result he was not selected in the Ontario Hockey League (OHL) 2017 OHL Priority Selection draft. He was one of only two eligible players on his team who were not drafted, which he called "pretty tough." Despite contemplating ending his hockey career, he was encouraged to continue by his parents. 

While playing with the St. Catharines Falcons of the Greater Ontario Junior Hockey League (GOJHL), Xhekaj drew the interest of the Kitchener Rangers scouting staff. They did not draft him in his second year of eligibility, but in 2018, Xhekaj earned an invitation to the Rangers' training camp. He made the roster and played two seasons in the OHL before the COVID-19 pandemic cancelled the 2020–21 season. 

Xhekaj was not selected in either the 2020 or 2021 NHL drafts. Ahead of the 2021–22 NHL season, he received a training camp invitation from the Montreal Canadiens. Xhekaj's performance impressed the team management. He signed a three-year, entry-level contract with the Canadiens on October 4, 2021, as an undrafted free agent. 

Xhekaj resumed play with the Rangers for the 2021–22 season, acquiring a reputation as a dangerous defenceman who was described by The Hockey News as having "effectively blended the old-school enforcer with the modern-day defensive blueliner." He was suspended twice in the fall, once for a slew foot and once for a gesture made after a fight. Among his teammates he was known as "the Sheriff." Midway through the year, Xhekaj was traded to his hometown Hamilton Bulldogs. Joining a highly-touted Bulldogs team, Xhekaj participated in their J. Ross Robertson Cup victory in the 2022 OHL playoffs and played in the 2022 Memorial Cup. The Bulldogs advanced to the Memorial Cup final, losing to the Saint John Sea Dogs. Xhekaj was named to the Memorial Cup All-Star Team for the tournament.

Professional
Upon entering the Canadiens' summer training, Xhekaj was initially considered more likely to earn a regular place on the American Hockey League (AHL) affiliate, the Laval Rocket, but he continued to distinguish himself in rookie tournament and preseason play. In the preseason, his aggressive physical style attracted attention from opposing teams' fans, notably the Ottawa Senators. In response, he stated, "when their whole Sens Nation is talking about me, it's pretty good. I like being the bad guy." 

With Mike Matheson and Joel Edmundson, the Canadiens' two veteran left defencemen, both injured in the preseason, additional openings were created for rookies to make the lineup. On October 10, 2022, it was confirmed that Xhekaj had made the Canadiens' opening night roster for the regular season. Upon making his NHL debut on October 12, Xhekaj became the first player in NHL history to have a surname beginning with the letter X. He picked up his first NHL point, an assist, in an October 15 game against the Washington Capitals. Xhekaj drew further headlines for winning his first fight in the NHL against Arizona Coyotes forward Zack Kassian, one of the league's more noted pugilists. Xhekaj scored his first NHL goal in a 5–2 loss to the Dallas Stars on October 22, also recording an assist in the same game. Xhekaj earned the nickname "Wi-Fi" from his teammates in reference to his complex surname being similar to an internet routers default password. Xhekaj's debut season came to an end when he sustained a season-ending shoulder injury on February 12, 2023. In 51 games with the Canadiens, he recorded five goals and eight assists, and led the team in penalty minutes at the time of his injury.

Personal life
Xhekaj's father, Arber (known as Jack), is an Albanian Kosovar, and his mother Simona is from Hradec Králové, Czech Republic. Both left their native countries in the 1990s, and first met at a hotel in Hamilton.

Xhekaj worked at a Costco in Hamilton during the COVID-19 pandemic after the 2020–21 OHL season was cancelled. Xhekaj has a younger brother, Florian, who played in the Ontario Hockey League for Hamilton.

Career statistics

References

External links
 

2001 births
Living people
Canadian people of Albanian descent
Canadian people of Czech descent
Hamilton Bulldogs (OHL) players
Kitchener Rangers players
Montreal Canadiens players
Undrafted National Hockey League players